The Ford Tempo is a compact car that was produced by Ford from the 1984 to 1994 model years.  The replacement for the Ford Fairmont, the Tempo was the fourth generation of compact sedans sold by Ford in North America.  Along with transitioning to front-wheel drive, the Tempo marked significant downsizing over its predecessor.  Mercury marketed the model line under the Mercury Topaz nameplate (no Lincoln version was sold).  The model line was produced as a two-door coupe and a four-door sedan through its production.    

Deriving its chassis underpinnings and powertrain from the Ford Escort, the Tempo/Topaz were the first aerodynamically-styled sedans introduced by Ford, preceded by the 1982 Ford Sierra hatchbacks (Ford of Europe) and the 1983 Ford Thunderbird; they were followed by the 1986 Ford Taurus.     

Produced across multiple facilities in North America, the Tempo/Topaz was produced in both a single generation (for two-doors) and two generations (for four-doors).  For the 1995 model year, the Tempo four-door sedan were replaced by the Ford Contour (and Mercury Mystique), developed from the Ford Mondeo; the two-door Tempo was not directly replaced.

Development
In the late 1970s Ford began planning to replace their compact rear wheel drive Ford Fairmont and Mercury Zephyr models with a new smaller front wheel drive (FWD) car. This new compact was expected to compete in the marketplace with General Motors' X-Body, but wound up more similar to GM's J-cars. Ford's chief development engineer for the new car was Ed Cascardo.

There were few common components due to the Tempo and Topaz's larger size. Switching to front-wheel drive freed up interior space that would have otherwise been lost to accommodate a driveshaft and rear differential.

Wind tunnel testing on the Tempo began in December 1978. More than 450 hours of testing resulted in over 950 different design changes. The Tempo and Topaz both featured windshields inclined at a 60° angle and aircraft-inspired door frames, two features that had both appeared on the Thunderbird and Cougar in 1983. The door frames wrapped up into the roofline, which improved sealing, allowed for hidden drip rails, and cleaned up the A-pillar area of the car. The rear track was widened, improving aerodynamic efficiency. The front grille was laid back and the leading edge of the hood was tuned for aerodynamic cleanliness. The wheels were pushed out to the corners of the body, reducing turbulence. The cars' backlights were also laid down at 60°, and the rear deck was raised, reducing drag and resulting in greater fuel efficiency. Viewed from the side, the raised trunk imparted a wedge stance to the car which was especially prominent on the two-door coupes. The aerodynamic work resulted in a coefficient of drag of 0.36 for the two-door Tempo, equal to that of the aero Ford Thunderbird. The four door returned a drag coefficient of 0.37.

The Tempo was designed for a four cylinder engine, but all production of Ford's 2.3 L Lima OHC four was committed to other product lines. In 1983 Ford had stopped production of their 200 cubic inch Thriftpower inline six, leaving unused capacity at the Lima Engine plant. Ford developed a four cylinder engine that shared some features of the Thriftpower six, topped with a new cylinder head and using other new technologies, while repurposing as much tooling as possible at the Lima plant.

When the cars were released, a turbocharged version of the new four cylinder was said to be in development, but this engine never became available. At that point, a V6 was not being considered.

Released in 1983 as a 1984 model, more than 107,000 two-door Tempos and more than 295,000 four-door Tempos were sold in its first year.

Features

Chassis and suspension
The Tempo's chassis is a steel unibody. The structure from the firewall forward is shared with the contemporary Ford Escort.

The Tempo's front suspension on each side comprises a lower lateral link triangulated by the anti-roll bar and a coil over MacPherson strut. The rear "Quadralink" suspension is two parallel lower lateral control links and a radius rod per side, with coil over MacPherson struts. This differed from the Escort's rear suspension, which used a lower lateral arm, radius rod, and non-concentric coil spring and shock absorber. The Tempo was the first ever American built Ford with an independent rear suspension using MacPherson struts. 

Brakes are  discs in front and  drums in back.

Steering is by power assisted rack and pinion, with three turns lock-to-lock.

Standard tires on base models are 175/80R13, while higher trim levels have 185/70R14, and sportier models are fitted with Michelin TRX 185/65R365 metric tires on aluminum wheels.

Powertrain
The Tempo's four cylinder gasoline engine is called the "High Swirl Combustion" (HSC) engine and displaces 2.3 L. It has a cast iron block and head, with a single cam-in-block and two overhead valves (OHV) per cylinder with pushrods and rocker arms. The HSC engine was also offered in a "High Specific Output" (HSO) version producing .

In 1992 the 3.0 L Ford Vulcan V6 engine became an option in the Tempo. Fitting the Vulcan V6 into the Tempo required changes to the water pump, and use of a more restrictive exhaust system that reduced maximum power.

The original base transmission in the gasoline fueled Tempo/Topaz is a four-speed IB4 manual that made up part of what Ford called the "Fuel Saver" powertrain. A five-speed MTX-III manual  or a three-speed FLC automatic were optional upgrades. 

From 1984 to 1986 a version of Mazda's four-cylinder RF diesel engine was offered in the Tempo and Topaz. The only transmission paired with the diesel engine was the 5-speed manual.

All Wheel Drive
An optional All Wheel Drive (AWD) system became available in the Tempo and Topaz in 1987, and was offered until 1991. Although Ford had a long history with four wheel drive, and had built prototypes based on other car models before, the AWD Tempo was their first production passenger sedan to offer four wheel drive.

This design of part-time system is not meant for serious off-road driving, nor for use on dry streets. It is designed specifically to provide additional traction in slippery road conditions. The system is controlled by a rocker switch in the interior. When activated, the system engages a clutch which sends power to a limited-slip rear differential via a new driveshaft. There is no transfer case.

The all-wheel-drive system adds  to the weight of the car, and increases ride height by just .

The only engine offered with the AWD option was the HSO four cylinder, with the 3-speed automatic transmission.

In 1991 Ford started referring to the system as "Four Wheel Drive" instead of All Wheel Drive.

First generation (1984–1987)

The first generation Tempo and Topaz were unveiled on the deck of the USS Intrepid, a decommissioned aircraft carrier that had been turned into a floating museum in New York Harbor. They were released on 26 May 1983 as 1984 models.

An early advertisement for the car featured a Tempo sedan performing a 360 degree loop on a stunt track. The car in the ad was securely attached to a track, and was pulled through the shot rather than operating under its own power.

As Ford's first downsized compact car, the Tempo arrived four years after GM's compact X-Bodies in 1979 for the 1980 model years, and two and a half years after Chrysler's compact K-cars were introduced. The four door Tempo had three windows in profile, somewhat similar to the European Ford Sierra, while the four-door Topaz received a more upright C-pillar without rear quarter windows. The front of the car featured two sealed-beam halogen headlamps in chrome trimmed recessed mounts, and the grille between them featured four thin horizontal slats, swept back to allow for greater air flow into the engine compartment and over the hood.

The first generation Tempo came standard with a four cylinder gasoline engine or an optional Mazda-built diesel engine. In late 1985 the four speed manual transmission was discontinued and the five-speed became standard. A slight modification was made to the five-speed transmission, moving the "reverse" position in the shift pattern from right beside first gear to the opposite bottom corner to reduce the likelihood of mistakenly selecting reverse rather than first gear during takeoff. The instrument panel featured a new, easier to read gauge layout, with all switches and controls placed within easy reach of the driver. In early 1985, the Tempo became the first production American automobile to feature a driver's side airbag as a supplemental restraint system. In 1984, Ford entered a contract with the General Services Administration and the Department of Transportation to supply 5,000 airbag-equipped Tempos. Half also received a special windshield designed to minimize lacerations to passengers, and all were early recipients of the high-mounted brake lights that became required by law in 1986.

Refreshed for 1986
In October 1985 the Tempo and the Topaz received several minor changes for the 1986 model year. The rectangular sealed-beam halogen headlamps were replaced with new, plastic composite enclosures with a replaceable lamp. The new headlights were flush-mounted to match the redesigned front corner lights and freshly restyled grille, which more closely matched that of the new Taurus that debuted in 1986, while the Topaz received a half pseudo-lightbar grille similar to the one on the upcoming Sable. In back, the trunk and taillights were slightly restyled.

The engine received a new central fuel injection (CFI) system, although the carbureted version was offered in Canada until 1987. In 1986, the Tempo surpassed the Hyundai Pony to become the best selling new car in Canada. A new "LX" luxury trim level replaced the GLX. Other changes included the addition of automatically retracting front seat belt shoulder straps, and a new all-wheel-drive model. Other features included power lumbar support, four-way power driver's seat, and a cassette player.

From 1985 to 1987, Ford offered the Sport GL, which included unique interior and exterior styling cues, the 2.3 L HSO engine, alloy wheels, tachometer, and the five-speed manual transaxle with a lower (numerically higher) final drive ratio of 3.73 for quicker acceleration. It was badged simply as "GL", but was recognizable because it lacked the GL's chrome front and rear bumpers.

For 1987, the Topaz received a standard all-wheel drive system for the GS-AWD and LS-AWD trim levels.

Trim levels
First generation Tempo trim levels:
 L   (Entry level model)
 GL  (Mid-range model. Also Sport GL)
 GLX (Luxury model. 1984 and 1985 model years only)
 LX  (Luxury model. Introduced for 1986. Replaced the GLX)
 AWD (1987 model year only.)

First generation Topaz trim levels:
 L (Entry level model. 1984 model year only)
 GS (Mid-range model. Equivalent to Tempo GL)
 GS-AWD (1987 model year only)
 LS (Luxury model)
 LS-AWD (1987 model year only)
 XR5 (Sport model. 1987 model year only. Coupe only)

Second generation (1988–1994)

For 1988 the Tempo and Topaz sedans were redesigned, while the coupes were just facelifted. The new look cars arrived in November 1987. The changes made the Tempo and Topaz look even more like their respective Taurus and Sable stablemates. The front of the Tempo got a completely restyled grille featuring three thin horizontal chrome bars with a Ford oval in the center, and two composite flush-mounted rectangular headlamps with restyled front turn signal housings on either side. On the Tempo GLS, the grille was blacked out, as was the "D" pillar. At the rear were brand new flush mounted tail lamps. The rear quarter window was redesigned to match and blend evenly with the restyled rear door trim. The Topaz was differentiated from the Tempo by a more formal, more vertical rear window, a waterfall grille, more upscale wheels, and solid red tail lamps.

The HSO engine was standard equipment on the Mercury Topaz XR5 and LTS models.

Both the sedan and coupe received a brand new instrument panel design with a central gauge cluster that included a standard engine temperature gauge, and more ergonomic driver controls. Fan and windshield wiper controls were now mounted on rotary-style switches on either side of the instrument panel, and the HVAC controls received a new push-button control layout. Other changes included reworked interior door panels. A driver's side airbag continued as an option, a rarity then for an economy level car. On Tempo LX and AWD models, the interior received chrome and wood trim on the dashboard and doors. Topaz models featured a tachometer-equipped gauge cluster and a front center armrest as standard.

For the 1991 model year the all-wheel drive Tempo and Topaz and the Canadian market exclusive entry-level Tempo L were discontinued. For 1992, the Tempo and Topaz got a minor restyle, with the Tempo gaining body-colored side trim that replaced the black and chrome trim, as well as full body-colored bumpers. The Tempo's three bar chrome grille was replaced with a body-colored monochromatic piece, while the Topaz's chrome grille was replaced with a non-functional light-bar.

Also for 1992, the 3.0 L Vulcan V6 engine from the Taurus and Sable was introduced as an option for the GL and LX models, and as the standard engine on the GLS. The 1992 model year was the last year of the GLS, as it and its Topaz counterpart were discontinued in 1993. This left the Tempo with only two trim level options, GL and LX. 1992 also brought a slightly redesigned gauge cluster, with a tachometer reading up to 7,000 rpm instead of the previous 6,000 rpm. A fuel door indicator was added to the fuel gauge as an arrow pointing to the side of the car where the fuel door was located. 1992 was the only year when a speedometer reading to 120 mph was available in American models, and only in the GLS, XR5 and LTS trim levels; all other model years read to 85 MPH. 

A revised body with eight headlamps was previewed late in 1991, and a redesigned Tempo was expected for 1993 or 1998. No new Tempo model appeared.

Trim levels
Second generation Tempo trim levels:
L (Entry level model. Discontinued in 1991)
GL (Mid-range model)
LX (Luxury model. Sedan only)
AWD (Includes LX trim. Sedan only. Discontinued in 1991)
GLS (Replaced Sport GL as the performance oriented model. Discontinued in 1992)

Second generation Topaz trim levels:
 GS (Mid-range model equivalent to the Tempo GL. Available from November 1987 to 1994)
 GS-AWD (Available from November 1987 to 1991)
 LS (Luxury model. Discontinued after 1992)
 LS-AWD (Sedan only. Available from November 1987 to 1991)
 XR5 (Sport model. Available from November 1987 to 1992. Coupe only. 3.0 L V6 engine was standard for 1992)
 LTS ("Luxury Touring Sedan". Four-door equivalent of the XR5. Available from November 1987 to 1992)

End of production
By 1993 Ford had been losing money on the Tempo for more than a decade. While the Tempo had long been a loss leader for Ford, the incoming Contour was based on the Mondeo, one of the most expensive cars in Ford's European lineup. Ford was unsuccessful in drawing a distinction between the Tempo and Contour, and many buyers assumed that the new car would be priced the same as the old, causing some to face a large sticker shock.

For buyers shopping for a compact Ford, moving to the Contour came with a jump in price: the range topping 1994 Tempo LX sedan with V6 cost about $12,900, while a base model 1995 Contour GL with four-cylinder engine and manual transmission was $13,990, .

The Oakville plant was retooled to build the new-for-1995 Ford Windstar, while Kansas City and Cuautitlán switched over to production of the Ford Contour and Mercury Mystique.

1994 marked the last year for the HSC engine, the 2.5 L having been dropped from the Taurus in 1991. It was also the end for the 3-speed FLC automatic transmission, with the Ford Escort and Mercury Tracer using the Ford F-4EAT transmission.

Production figures
The Tempo was a sales success for Ford, staying one of the top ten best selling cars in the US, if not one of the top five, during its entire production run. Through 1984, Ford sold a total of 531,468 examples of the Tempo and Topaz, nearly 100,000 more units than the best-selling Toyota Camry of the day. All model year production figures for the Tempo are as follows:

Other markets

China
At least 8,200 Tempos were sent to China as part of Ford's first efforts to sell cars to the Asian nation.

In an attempt to ease trade tensions with the United States, China agreed to buy millions of dollars worth of cars from the big three American automakers. Ford's share of the deal was worth $32 million.

This arrangement let China keep its favored nation status with the U.S. despite political tensions, and reduce China's dependence on autos imported from Japan.

The initial order included 3,010 Tempos that were to be used as taxis and tourist vehicles. It has been suggested that they were never used as taxis, but instead went to the government and were later sold to the private market.

Mexico
Ford assembled and sold two models based on the American Tempo in Mexico — the Ford Topaz and the Ford Ghia.

The cars were built in Ford's Cuautitlán Assembly plant. The lower level of automation at that plant translated into higher assembly costs, making a Mexican-built Ford Topaz retail for about US$400 more than a more well equipped US model with more effective pollution controls.

The first to hit the Mexican market was the Ford Topaz, debuting in 1984. This car was based on the American Tempo, and was offered in both two door and four door sedan versions. Like the US model, the Ford Topaz was restyled in 1988.

The Ford Ghia debuted in 1992. Based on the American Mercury Topaz, this model was more luxuriously trimmed. A 5-speed manual transmission and V6 engine were available.

T-Drive Tempo
In or around 1990, a modified Tempo was used as a rolling testbed for a new powertrain configuration that Ford called "T-Drive". This system used transverse inline engines with the drive for the transmission taken off the center of the crankshaft, rather than the end.

The test Tempo's original transverse straight four engine and transaxle were replaced with a transversely mounted DOHC straight-eight engine and a center-mounted longitudinal transaxle. The T-Drive specification allowed for engines of 4, 6, and 8 cylinders of 2.0 L, 3.2 L, and 4.0 L respectively, and the Tempo received the largest engine.

In 1991 the T-Drive technology was unveiled to the public as part of two concept cars; the Contour sedan and the Mystique minivan. It did not go into production.

References

Further reading
 Car and Driver, March 1983, Volume 28, Number 9
 Motor Trend, March 1983
 Road & Track, April 1983
 Road & Track, November 1983, Volume 35, Number 3

External links

Tempo
Front-wheel-drive vehicles
All-wheel-drive vehicles
Compact cars
Coupés
Sedans
Cars introduced in 1983
1990s cars
Motor vehicles manufactured in the United States
Goods manufactured in Canada
Cars discontinued in 1994